The canton of Sarreguemines is a canton of France, located in the Moselle department and the Grand Est region. Since the French canton reorganisation which came into effect in March 2015, the communes of the canton of Sarreguemines are:

 Bliesbruck
 Blies-Ébersing
 Blies-Guersviller
 Frauenberg
 Grosbliederstroff
 Hambach
 Hundling
 Ippling
 Kalhausen
 Lixing-lès-Rouhling
 Neufgrange
 Rémelfing
 Rouhling
 Sarreguemines
 Sarreinsming
 Wiesviller
 Willerwald
 Wittring
 Wœlfling-lès-Sarreguemines
 Zetting

See also
Cantons of the Moselle department
Communes of the Moselle department

References

Cantons of Moselle (department)